The 2019 Survivor Series was the 33rd annual Survivor Series professional wrestling pay-per-view and livestreaming event produced by WWE. It was held for wrestlers from the promotion's Raw, SmackDown, and NXT brand divisions. The event took place on November 24, 2019, at the Allstate Arena in the Chicago suburb of Rosemont, Illinois. It was the first and only Survivor Series to include the NXT brand (along with NXT's sister brand NXT UK, which was grouped with NXT), the first since 2009 to feature three major brands, and the first and only to feature three-way Survivor Series elimination matches. The theme of the event was brand supremacy and featured wrestlers from the three brands against each other. This was the first event to take place in Rosemont, Illinois since 1989.

Ten matches were contested at the event, including three on the Kickoff pre-show. The card was highlighted by two Survivor Series elimination matches: Team NXT won the women's match in the opening bout, while Team SmackDown won the men's match. In the main event, NXT Women's Champion Shayna Baszler defeated Raw Women's Champion Becky Lynch and SmackDown Women's Champion Bayley in a non-title triple threat match. NXT won brand supremacy by winning four of the seven interbrand matches; SmackDown won two while Raw's sole win was on the pre-show. In what were the only non-interbrand matches on the card, all three of WWE's world championships were defended: Brock Lesnar retained Raw's WWE Championship against Rey Mysterio in a No Holds Barred match, "The Fiend" Bray Wyatt retained SmackDown's Universal Championship against Daniel Bryan, and Adam Cole retained the NXT Championship against Pete Dunne.

Production

Background
Survivor Series is an annual gimmick pay-per-view (PPV) and WWE Network event, produced every November by WWE since 1987. The second longest running pay-per-view event in history (behind WWE's WrestleMania), it is one of the promotion's original four pay-per-views, along with WrestleMania, Royal Rumble, and SummerSlam, referred to as the "Big Four". The event is traditionally characterized by having Survivor Series matches, which are tag team elimination matches that typically pits teams of four or five wrestlers against each other. The 2019 event, which was the 33rd event in the Survivor Series chronology, was scheduled to be held on November 24, 2019, at the Allstate Arena in the Chicago suburb of Rosemont, Illinois.

Since WWE reintroduced the brand split in July 2016, Survivor Series has centered around competition between wrestlers from Raw and SmackDown for brand supremacy. In addition to traditional Survivor Series matches between the brands, the champions of Raw face their SmackDown counterparts in non-title matches, which began at the 2017 event. In September 2019, NXT, previously WWE's developmental territory, debuted on the USA Network, solidifying its status as WWE's third major brand, and was subsequently added to the 2019 event as part of the brand competition theme (wrestlers from NXT UK also appeared and were grouped under the NXT umbrella). It was in turn the first Survivor Series to include NXT and the first since the 2009 event to feature a third major brand. Due to NXT's addition, it was the first Survivor Series to have three-way Survivor Series elimination matches. 

With the exception of the men's top champions—as each brand's top championship was defended at the event—the 2019 Survivor Series featured the Raw, SmackDown, and NXT Women's Champions facing off, Raw's United States Champion, SmackDown's Intercontinental Champion, and NXT's North American Champion going against each other, and the Raw, SmackDown, and NXT Tag Team Champions in a triple threat tag team match. As the NXT Cruiserweight Championship was the only title of its kind in WWE, it was defended in a triple threat match against challengers of the opposing brands. During a media call for NXT TakeOver: WarGames, WWE Chief Operating Officer and NXT head Triple H said that there were talks of doing a triple threat match between Raw's WWE Champion, SmackDown's Universal Champion, and the NXT Champion, but because of the storyline between WWE Champion Brock Lesnar and Rey Mysterio, they felt that their match needed to happen at this event. He also said that Universal Champion "The Fiend" Bray Wyatt worked better in his own storyline.

Storylines
The show comprised ten matches, including three on the Kickoff pre-show. The matches resulted from scripted storylines, where wrestlers portrayed heroes, villains, or less distinguishable characters in scripted events that built tension and culminated in a wrestling match or series of matches. Results were predetermined by WWE's writers on the Raw, SmackDown, and NXT brands, while storylines were produced on WWE's weekly television shows, Monday Night Raw, Friday Night SmackDown, and Wednesday night's NXT.

World championship matches
On the September 30 episode of Raw, Brock Lesnar brutally attacked Rey Mysterio as well as Mysterio's son, Dominic, who was seated in the front row. After Lesnar won the WWE Championship during SmackDown's 20th Anniversary, an injured Mysterio appeared along with Dominic's godfather and Lesnar's former Ultimate Fighting Championship rival, Cain Velasquez, who attacked Lesnar. At Crown Jewel, Lesnar retained the championship against Velasquez by submission and continued to apply the Kimura Lock after the match had concluded until Mysterio attacked Lesnar with a chair. Lesnar fended off Mysterio, who retaliated by striking Lesnar with multiple chair shots, forcing him to retreat. On the following SmackDown, Lesnar quit SmackDown to move to Raw (with the WWE Championship) in order to seek revenge against Mysterio, who had been drafted to Raw. On the following Raw, Lesnar proceeded to attack crew members in search of Mysterio, including commentator Dio Maddin, whom he put through the broadcast table with an F-5. Mysterio then appeared, struck Lesnar with a steel pipe, and later challenged Lesnar for the WWE Championship at Survivor Series, which was made official. On the November 18 episode of Raw, Lesnar's advocate Paul Heyman suggested a No Holds Barred match and Mysterio accepted.

At Crown Jewel, SmackDown wrestler "The Fiend" Bray Wyatt won Raw's Universal Championship, thus transferring the title to SmackDown. Backstage during the November 8 episode of SmackDown, as Sami Zayn was trying to convince Daniel Bryan to join his faction, "The Fiend" appeared and attacked Bryan with the Mandible Claw. During a "Miz TV" segment the following week, Wyatt (as his normal self) taunted Bryan by mocking the latter's former "Yes Movement" persona. In response, Bryan challenged Wyatt for the Universal Championship at Survivor Series and Wyatt accepted, but with Bryan facing Wyatt's alter-ego "The Fiend".

On November 19, Adam Cole was scheduled to defend the NXT Championship at Survivor Series. His opponent was determined by a triple threat match that occurred at TakeOver: WarGames the night before Survivor Series, where Pete Dunne defeated Damian Priest and Killian Dain to earn the title shot. This marked the first time that an NXT championship was to be defended on the main card of a Survivor Series event.

Champions brand supremacy matches
On the November 1 episode of SmackDown, after Bayley defeated Nikki Cross to retain the SmackDown Women's Championship due to interference from Sasha Banks, NXT Women's Champion Shayna Baszler appeared and attacked all three. During a sit-down interview on the following Raw, Charly Caruso informed Raw Women's Champion Becky Lynch that she would be facing Baszler and Bayley in a non-title triple threat match at Survivor Series, after which, Baszler appeared and confronted Lynch. Over the following weeks, the three would invade each others shows, attacking one another.

Prior to the November 6 episode of NXT, Raw's The O.C. (AJ Styles, Luke Gallows, and Karl Anderson) invaded NXT and attacked The Undisputed Era (Adam Cole, Bobby Fish, Kyle O'Reilly, and Roderick Strong). On the November 11 episode of Raw, a non-title triple threat match between United States Champion AJ Styles, Intercontinental Champion Shinsuke Nakamura, and North American Champion Roderick Strong was scheduled for Survivor Series. Following a tag team match on the November 22 episode of SmackDown, the three brawled with each other.

On the November 4 episode of Raw, a non-title triple threat tag team match between Raw Tag Team Champions The Viking Raiders (Erik and Ivar), SmackDown Tag Team Champions The Revival (Scott Dawson and Dash Wilder), and NXT Tag Team Champions The Undisputed Era (Bobby Fish and Kyle O'Reilly) was scheduled for Survivor Series. However, on the November 8 episode of SmackDown, The New Day's Big E and Kofi Kingston defeated The Revival to win the SmackDown Tag Team Championship, thus replacing them in the match. During a rematch the following week, The Undisputed Era invaded SmackDown and interfered, costing The Revival the match.

Survivor Series elimination matches
On the November 8 episode of SmackDown, Michael Cole announced Sasha Banks as the captain for Team SmackDown's women's team. Later that night, Carmella and Dana Brooke defeated Fire & Desire (Mandy Rose and Sonya Deville) to qualify for the team after the match had been rescheduled due to a backstage attack from NXT's Bianca Belair the previous week that led to Rhea Ripley and Tegan Nox defeating Fire & Desire. On November 14, WWE.com announced Lacey Evans as the fourth member of Team SmackDown, followed by Nikki Cross on November 17 after Cross, who was originally scheduled to face Bayley in a non-title qualifying match, scored the pin in an eight-woman tag team match on the November 15 episode of SmackDown. On the November 18 episode of Raw, Charlotte Flair was announced as the captain for Team Raw, with Natalya, Sarah Logan, and WWE Women's Tag Team Champions The Kabuki Warriors (Asuka and Kairi Sane) revealed as the other team members later that night. Following a tag team match that night in which Flair and Becky Lynch faced The IIconics (Billie Kay and Peyton Royce), the latter being disgruntled as they were not selected for Team Raw, NXT's Shayna Baszler, Marina Shafir, and Jessamyn Duke attacked the women. On the November 22 episode of SmackDown, Rhea Ripley was revealed as the captain for Team NXT. Later that night, Ripley defeated Flair and Banks in a triple threat match, and a brawl occurred with all the women from the three brands following the match. After the conclusion of TakeOver: WarGames, Ripley picked Candice LeRae, Bianca Belair, Io Shirai, and Toni Storm (from NXT UK) as the other members of Team NXT.

On November 8, WWE.com announced that Seth Rollins was selected as the captain for Team Raw's men's team, with Kevin Owens, Ricochet, Randy Orton, and Drew McIntyre revealed as the other team members during the November 11 episode of Raw. On the November 12 episode of WWE Backstage, Roman Reigns was revealed as the captain for Team SmackDown, with Mustafa Ali (formerly known as Ali), Braun Strowman, King Corbin, and Shorty G also announced for the team. NXT head Triple H tried to convince Rollins as well as Owens to leave Raw and come back to NXT where they had started their WWE careers. Both turned down the offers, leading to the NXT roster attacking members of Raw, as well as those on SmackDown. At the conclusion of the November 18 Raw, Triple H invited members of Raw and SmackDown to the following episode of NXT, where a large brawl broke out between all three brands. All the members of Raw, SmackDown, and NXT would brawl again following the conclusion of a six-man tag team match on the November 22 episode of SmackDown. Triple H, Shawn Michaels, and Road Dogg led the NXT roster in the invasion of SmackDown, reenacting how D-Generation X had attempted to invade World Championship Wrestling's Monday Nitro in 1998 with a tank. After the conclusion of TakeOver: WarGames, Triple H announced that Shawn Michaels would reveal the members of Team NXT during the Survivor Series Kickoff pre-show.

Event

Pre-show
Three matches occurred during the two-hour Survivor Series Kickoff pre-show, two of which were announced during the pre-show. In the first match, Dolph Ziggler and Robert Roode from SmackDown won an interbrand 10-man battle royal featuring tag teams from the three brands, lastly eliminating The Street Profits (Angelo Dawkins and Montez Ford) from Raw, giving SmackDown the first point of the night.

In the second pre-show match, NXT's Lio Rush defended the NXT Cruiserweight Championship in an interbrand triple threat match against Raw's Akira Tozawa and SmackDown's Kalisto. In the end, Rush performed a Final Hour on Kalisto to retain the title, giving NXT their first point.

The last match of the pre-show was the non-title triple threat match between the brands' tag team champions, Raw Tag Team Champions The Viking Raiders (Erik and Ivar), SmackDown Tag Team Champions The New Day (Big E and Kofi Kingston), and NXT Tag Team Champions The Undisputed Era (Bobby Fish and Kyle O'Reilly). The climax saw The Viking Raiders perform The Viking Experience on O'Reilly onto Fish and pin Fish, tying the brands at 1 point each.

Also during the Kickoff pre-show, Shawn Michaels revealed Tommaso Ciampa (as captain), Damian Priest, Keith Lee, Matt Riddle, and WWE United Kingdom Champion Walter (from NXT UK) as the members of Team NXT for the men's three-way Survivor Series elimination match.

Preliminary matches
The actual pay-per-view opened with the women's three-way Survivor Series elimination match, featuring Team Raw (Charlotte Flair, Natalya, Sarah Logan, and WWE Women's Tag Team Champions Asuka and Kairi Sane) against Team SmackDown (Sasha Banks, Carmella, Dana Brooke, Lacey Evans, and Nikki Cross) against Team NXT (Rhea Ripley, Bianca Belair, Candice LeRae, Io Shirai, and Toni Storm). After a brawl, Shirai and LeRae were taken to the back for apparently sustaining injuries. The first elimination occurred when Belair trapped Cross in a roll up after Ripley had distracted the latter. Logan was next eliminated by Belair, who performed a 450 Splash on Logan. The next two women eliminated were Carmella who was pinned by a natural selection from Charlotte, shortly followed by Kairi Sane who was eliminated by a Meteora from Banks. Asuka eliminated Brooke after a kick. Flair and Asuka subsequently got into an altercation resulting in Asuka spitting green mist in Flair's face, who was then blinded and was eliminated by Evans after performing a Women's Right; Asuka also walked out of the match during this time, resulting in her elimination by forfeit. Evans was pinned by Natalya with a schoolboy, who then applied a dual submission alongside Banks to eliminate Storm. Belair was then eliminated by Banks after an assisted spinebuster/clothesline combo. Banks also took out Natalya with a punch, following a brief alliance against Ripley. Shirai and LeRae then returned, having feigned their injuries, and aided Ripley, who performed a Riptide on Banks to win the match for Team NXT, bringing NXT's score to 2 points with Raw and SmackDown at 1 point each.

Backstage, Team Raw's men's captain Seth Rollins questioned Kevin Owens' loyalty as Owens had appeared at NXT TakeOver: WarGames the previous night as the mystery partner for Tommaso Ciampa's team in the men's WarGames match. Owens assured Rollins that his loyalty was with Raw and that he had only participated in that match to get revenge on The Undisputed Era for attacking him on the previous episode of Raw. Owens then questioned Rollins' own loyalty, bringing up how Rollins had turned on his teammates in The Shield back in 2014.

Next was the non-title triple threat match between the brands' secondary champions, Raw's United States Champion AJ Styles, SmackDown's Intercontinental Champion Shinsuke Nakamura (accompanied by Sami Zayn), and NXT North American Champion Roderick Strong. In the closing moments, as Styles performed a Phenomenal Forearm on Nakamura, Strong threw Styles out of the ring and pinned Nakamura to win the match, bringing NXT's score to 3 points.

After that was the first of the three non-interbrand championship matches in which Adam Cole defended the NXT Championship against Pete Dunne. In the climax, Cole performed a Last Shot to the back of Dunne's head to retain the title.

The fourth match was SmackDown's world championship match where "The Fiend" Bray Wyatt defended the Universal Championship against Daniel Bryan. Bryan performed a Running Knee on The Fiend for a near-fall. Bryan performed Yes Kicks and three consecutive missile dropkicks on The Fiend. As Bryan went back to the top rope, The Fiend caught Bryan with the Mandible Claw submission, causing Bryan to pass out with The Fiend getting the pinfall victory to retain the title.

Next was the men's three-way Survivor Series elimination match, featuring Team Raw (Seth Rollins, Drew McIntyre, Kevin Owens, Randy Orton, and Ricochet) against Team SmackDown (Roman Reigns, Braun Strowman, King Corbin, Mustafa Ali, and Shorty G) against Team NXT (Tommaso Ciampa, Damian Priest, Matt Riddle, Keith Lee, and WWE United Kingdom Champion Walter). McIntyre performed a Claymore Kick on Walter to eliminate him. Shorty G was then pinned by Owens after a frog splash. Ciampa performed a Spike DDT on Owens to eliminate him. Orton performed an RKO on Priest to eliminate him, before Riddle rolled up Orton to eliminate him. Riddle himself was then eliminated by Corbin after Orton performed an RKO on Riddle in anger. After a brawl outside the ring, Strowman was eliminated by countout. Corbin then performed End of Days on Ricochet to eliminate him. Ali was eliminated after a Stomp by Rollins. McIntyre was the next eliminated after a Spear from Reigns. Corbin was then eliminated after he received a Spear from teammate Reigns, and Ciampa pinned Corbin. Rollins and Reigns briefly teamed up and attempted to perform The Shield's signature powerbomb on Ciampa through an announce table, only for Lee to save Ciampa. Back in the ring, Rollins performed The Stomp on Ciampa to eliminate him followed by Lee eliminating Rollins with a fireman’s carry jackhammer. Lee performed the Spirit Bomb on Reigns for a near-fall. As Lee then attempted a moonsault, Reigns avoided Lee and performed a Spear to win the match as the sole survivor for Team SmackDown, bringing SmackDown's score to 2 points with NXT at 3 points and Raw at 1 point. Following the match, Reigns showed respect to Lee by offering him a fist bump which Lee accepted.

The penultimate match was for Raw's world championship, where Brock Lesnar (accompanied by Paul Heyman) defended the WWE Championship against Rey Mysterio in a No Holds Barred match. Despite Mysterio quickly exiting the ring at the start of the match to obtain a steel pipe, Lesnar stopped Mysterio from using it and dominated him. Mysterio's son Dominik ran to the ring with a towel in hand, pleading with Lesnar to stop the onslaught. As Lesnar was distracted, Mysterio attacked Lesnar with a low blow, followed by one from Dominik. The father and son then attacked Lesnar with a steel pipe and steel chair, respectively, and then performed double 619's and dual Frog Splashes on Lesnar for a near-fall. As they attempted additional Frog Splashes, Lesnar quickly grabbed Dominik and performed a German suplex on him. Lesnar then caught Mysterio in midair and performed an F-5 to retain the title.

Main event
The main event was the non-title triple threat match between the brands' women's champions, Raw Women's Champion Becky Lynch, SmackDown Women's Champion Bayley, and NXT Women's Champion Shayna Baszler. In the climax, as Lynch was down outside the ring, Bayley attempted a Diving Elbow Drop on Baszler, who caught her in the Kirifuda Clutch, forcing Bayley to submit to win the match. Baszler's win gave NXT the final point of the night to win brand supremacy at 4 points, where SmackDown had 2 points and Raw only had 1. Following the match, Lynch attacked Baszler and put her through the announce table.

Aftermath

Raw
During the opening of the following night's Raw, Team Raw's men's captain Seth Rollins addressed the Raw locker room, who surrounded the ring, and criticized their poor performance at Survivor Series. In particular, Rollins singled out the performances of women's captain Charlotte Flair, Randy Orton, and Rey Mysterio (for not winning the WWE Championship as Brock Lesnar rarely appears), as well as AOP (Akam and Rezar) for not participating at all. Turning heel for the first time since 2016 and alienated by the comments, each wrestler gradually walked out. Rollins then addressed Kevin Owens, the last remaining wrestler at the ring. He again questioned Owens' loyalty to Raw, and accused Owens of lazily trying to be like himself. In response, Owens performed a stunner on Rollins and later challenged him to a match. During the match, AOP entered the ring. Owens slapped Akam, resulting in AOP attacking Owens, giving him a disqualification win. AOP then turned their attention to Rollins, who was ready to fight, but they instead left the ring. Rollins then performed two Stomps on Owens, teasing a heel turn for Rollins.

Also on Raw, a United States Championship match between AJ Styles and Humberto Carrillo was initially scheduled, only for Styles' O.C. teammates Luke Gallows and Karl Anderson to attack Carrillo from behind during his entrance, rendering him unable to compete. Ricochet, Drew McIntyre, Randy Orton, and Rey Mysterio then requested a title match. A fatal four-way match was contested to determine who would challenge Styles for the title that night. Mysterio won the fatal four-way match and subsequently defeated Styles to win the United States Championship for a second time, with help from Orton.

Due to the events that occurred between Charlotte Flair and Asuka during the women's Survivor Series match, a match between the two was scheduled on the following night's Raw, where Asuka pinned Flair after an assist from her tag team partner Kairi Sane and again spitting green mist in Flair's face.

SmackDown
Team SmackDown's men's captain Roman Reigns opened the following SmackDown. Reigns thanked his SmackDown team, except King Corbin, whom he called out. Corbin claimed it was because of him that SmackDown won, and stated that Reigns betrayed his team when Reigns caused his elimination by attacking him. Reigns challenged Corbin to a match, however, Corbin instead brought out Dolph Ziggler and Robert Roode and Roode challenged Reigns instead, in which Reigns won. Following the match, a brawl ensued.

Also on the following SmackDown, Universal Champion "The Fiend" Bray Wyatt challenged Daniel Bryan, who was now embracing the Yes Movement again, to another match which Bryan accepted. The Fiend then attacked Bryan, ripping out his hair. He also debuted a new custom championship belt.

SmackDown Women's Champion Bayley and Team SmackDown women's captain Sasha Banks stated they did not lose at Survivor Series because NXT was better, but because the rest of SmackDown let them down. Banks and Bayley criticized each member of Team SmackDown with Lacey Evans being last, who came out to confront them and delivered a Women's Right to Banks.

NXT
On the following NXT, the entire roster (including NXT UK) celebrated their brand's victory over Raw and SmackDown at Survivor Series only for The Undisputed Era to interrupt. Adam Cole stated that the only reason NXT won was due to their stable. Tommaso Ciampa reminded Cole that it was his team that defeated The Undisputed Era at WarGames and warned them that their days of holding their respective championships were numbered, with Ciampa focusing on Cole's NXT Championship. Finn Bálor then interrupted. In response, Ciampa issued a challenge to Bálor, which the latter agreed, and Bálor defeated Ciampa due to interference from Cole. Following the match, Bálor performed a  Pele Kick on Cole.

Also on the following NXT, Rhea Ripley had a face-to-face confrontation with NXT Women's Champion Shayna Baszler, and congratulated her for defeating Raw Women's Champion Becky Lynch and SmackDown Women's Champion Bayley at Survivor Series. Ripley then reminded Baszler that her team defeated Baszler's team at WarGames and then issued a challenge to Baszler for her championship.

Also on the following NXT, Lio Rush defeated Raw's Akira Tozawa to retain the NXT Cruiserweight Championship.

Although NXT had won the brand competition for the 2019 Survivor Series, the brand was removed from the competition at the 2020 event. NXT was removed due to COVID-19-related issues, as outbreaks of the virus had occurred at both of NXT's home arenas, Full Sail University and then the WWE Performance Center, prompting WWE to exclude NXT wrestlers from the event to avoid potential transmission of the virus to members of the Raw and SmackDown rosters. In September 2021, NXT was restructured as NXT 2.0 and reverted to its developmental roots.

Results

Survivor Series elimination matches
Team
 – Raw
 – SmackDown
 – NXT

References

External links
 

2019
2019 WWE Network events
2019 WWE pay-per-view events
Professional wrestling in the Chicago metropolitan area
Events in Rosemont, Illinois
2019 in Illinois
November 2019 events in the United States